Ji Sang-ryeol (born December 26, 1970) is a South Korean actor, comedian, and host. Ji has made numerous appearances in dramas and TV Shows. He is well known for his blunt yet humorous personality in TV Shows such as X-Man and being of the main MCs of top Korean variety show 2 Days & 1 Night until a sudden withdrawal and replaced by Kim C. In 2010 Ji was one of the main MCs of Family Outing 2 along with female comedian Shin Bong-sun.

Filmography

TV dramas 
Lee San, Wind of the Palace (MBC, 2007)
Common Single (SBS, 2006)
A Love to Kill (KBS2, 2005)
Bad Housewife (SBS, 2005)
Banjun Drama (SBS, 2004)
Match Made in Heaven (MBC, 2004)
Dae Jang Geum (MBC, 2003)
The Bean Chaff of My Life (MBC, 2003)
My Platoon Leader (MBC, 2002)

Variety shows and Comedy 
X-Man
2 Days & 1 Night
Family Outing 2
Rainbow Kids
Law of the Jungle in Sumatra
Living Together in Empty Room
The Fishermen and the City (Season 2)
Good.R.Sam MBC Drama Net

Television shows

Radio shows

Web shows

Education
Korea National Open University

References

1970 births
South Korean male television actors
South Korean male comedians
Living people